Dambasürengiin Batsüren (born 2004), is a Mongolian chess player. He was Candidate Master (CM) in 2014, FIDE Master  (FM) in 2015, International Master (IM) 2017. He was awarded the title of Grandmaster in 2020. As of July 2021, he is the 2nd-highest ranked player in Mongolia.

Career

He has qualified to play in the Chess World Cup 2021 by winning the Mongolian qualifying event. In 2022, he won Mongolian Chess Championship.

References

External links

Dambasuren Batsuren chess games at 365Chess.com

2004 births
Living people
Mongolian chess players